Papol-e Madian Rud (also Romanized as Pāpol-e Mādīān Rūd; also known as Pāpol-e Mādīān and Pāpol) is a village in Kuhdasht-e Jonubi Rural District, in the Central District of Kuhdasht County, Lorestan Province, Iran. At the 2006 census, its population was 80, in 15 families.

References 

Towns and villages in Kuhdasht County